Woodington is an unincorporated community in Darke County, in the U.S. state of Ohio.

History
Woodington was laid out in 1871. The community most likely was named after John Woodington, an early settler.

Notable person
Lowell Thomas, journalist, broadcaster, and writer

References

Unincorporated communities in Darke County, Ohio
Unincorporated communities in Ohio
Populated places established in 1871
1871 establishments in Ohio